Jarlath is an Irish given name. Notable persons with this name include:

Iarlaithe mac Loga or Saint Jarlath (fl. 6th century), Irish priest and scholar, founder of School of Tuam and patron saint of Archdiocese of Tuam
St. Jarlath's College, Roman Catholic secondary school for boys in Tuam, County Galway, Ireland
St Jarlath's Park, Gaelic Athletic Association stadium in Tuam, County Galway, Ireland
Jarlath Carey (1932–2006), Northern Ireland Gaelic footballer
Jarlath Conroy (born 1944), Irish-born actor
Jarlath McDonagh (born 1945), Irish politician (Fine Gael)
Jarlath Cloonan (born 1953), former County Galway Senior Hurling Manager
Jarlath Fallon (born 1973) is a Gaelic footballer 
Jarlath Regan (born 1980), Irish stand-up comedian
Jarlath Henderson (born 1985), Northern Irish folk musician

Irish-language masculine given names